Helen Collins was born in Hamilton, New Zealand on 3 October 1988 and has represented New Zealand in association football at international level. She plays her club football with Claudelands Rovers.

Collins was a member of the New Zealand U-20 side at the 2006 FIFA U-20 Women's World Championship, making just two appearances at the finals in Russia.

Collins made her senior début in a 1–0 win over Scotland on 6 March 2013.

References

External links

1988 births
Living people
New Zealand women's association footballers
New Zealand women's international footballers
Women's association football forwards
Sportspeople from Thames, New Zealand
Hamilton Wanderers players